Robert Stehli (2 February 1930 – 3 April 2018) was a Swiss conductor.

Life 
Born in Zürich, Stehli received his musical education at the music academies of Zurich and Lübeck. From 1965 to 1968, Stehli also held the position of second Kapellmeister of the Niedersächsisches Symphonie-Orchester in Hanover, which he also conducted with large symphony concerts on guest appearances outside Hanover.

Since 1968, Stehli managed the Hamburger Mozart-Orchester (today KlassikPhilharmonie Hamburg), 
with which he also distinguished himself internationally.

Stehli died at the age of 88.

Awards 
 2003: Biermann-Ratjen-Medaille
 2009: 
 2011: Order of Merit of the Federal Republic of Germany for his life achievement.

Compositions 
 Sommerkantate, Möseler, Wolfenbüttel 1956
 Drei Chöre, Tonger, Rodenkirchen/Rhein 1957
 Last night of the proms, Hamburger Mozart-Orchester, Hamburg 2003
 Hamburg proms last night, Klassik-Philharmonie, Hamburg 2003
 Eine kleine Nachtmusik, Bella Musica Tonträger, Bühl 1983
 Virtuose Trompeten-Konzerte, Deutsche Grammophon, Hamburg 1978

References

External links 
 
 

Swiss conductors (music)
Recipients of the Cross of the Order of Merit of the Federal Republic of Germany
1930 births
2018 deaths
Musicians from Zürich